Afféry  (also spelled Aféri) is a town in south-eastern Ivory Coast. It is a sub-prefecture of Akoupé Department in La Mé Region, Lagunes District. Afféry is also a commune.

References

Sub-prefectures of La Mé
Communes of La Mé